Graham Matters (19 July 1948 - 7 May 2021) was an Australian actor and musician.

He appeared in the 1976 film Oz as Wally, the Wizard, record salesman and tram conductor. He was one of the original Australian cast members of The Rocky Horror Picture Show in 1974.

Filmography

References

External links
Biographical cuttings on Graham Matters, former theatrical performer, containing one or more cuttings from newspapers or journals held at the National Library of Australia
 

1948 births
2021 deaths
Australian male stage actors
Australian male film actors
Male actors from Melbourne